Lucina River can refer to

Lucina River (Moldova) tributary of the Moldova River in Romania
Lučina (river) tributary of the Ostravice in the Czech Republic